Buhle "Bush" Mxunyelwa (born 25 June 1986) is a South African professional rugby union player currently playing with the . His regular position is tighthead prop.

Career

Youth

Mxunyelwa played for the  side in the 2005, 2006 and 2007 Under-21 Provincial Championships.

Border Bulldogs

He made a total of seven appearances during the competition and also broke into their Currie Cup side for the 2008 Currie Cup First Division competition.

Western Province / Maties

In 2010, Mxunyelwa moved to the Western Cape. He played in six of the  matches during the 2010 Varsity Cup competition, helping them win the competition for the third year in a row, but not being involved in the latter stages of the competition. Instead, he represented  in the 2010 Vodacom Cup competition, starting in six of their matches.

Mxunyelwa was also included in Western Province's squad for the 2010 Currie Cup Premier Division season.

Mxunyelwa started in six of the ' seven matches during the 2011 Varsity Cup, but failed to feature for Western Province at provincial level.

Leopards

Mxunyelwa moved to Potchefstroom to join the  prior to the 2011 Currie Cup Premier Division season. He made a total of eight appearances for them during the 2012 and 2013 Vodacom Cup competitions and also represented club side Rustenburg Impala in the 2013 SARU Community Cup competition, making three appearances.

Ireland

Mxunyelwa then went to Ireland, where he played for Dublin-based AIL side Wanderers during the 2013–2014 season.

Return to Border Bulldogs

Mxunyelwa returned to South Africa in 2014 and rejoined former side  for the 2014 Currie Cup qualification campaign.

References

1986 births
Living people
Border Bulldogs players
Leopards (rugby union) players
Rugby union players from East London, Eastern Cape
Rugby union props
South African rugby union players
Stellenbosch University alumni
University of Fort Hare alumni
Wanderers F.C. (rugby union) players
Western Province (rugby union) players